Allison Nutting-Wong (born  1991) is a New Hampshire, United States, politician.

Early life and education
Nutting-Wong was born around 1991. Nutting-Wong earned a BA in political science from Russell Sage College.

Career
Nutting-Wong worked for 10 years as an office manager. In 2014, Nutting-Wong ran unsuccessfully for one of the New Hampshire House of Representatives seats representing the Hillsborough 34 district. In 2015, Nutting-Wong ran unsuccessfully for the position of at-large representative of the Nashua School District. On November 8, 2016, Nutting-Wong was elected to the New Hampshire House of Representatives where she represented the Hillsborough 34 district until May 24, 2018, when she resigned after moving out of the district. On November 6, 2018, Nutting-Wong was elected to the New Hampshire House of Representatives where she represents the Hillsborough 32 district. She assumed office on December 5, 2018. She is a Democrat.

Personal life
Nutting-Wong resides in Nashua, New Hampshire. Nutting-Wong is married to Matthew, and together they have one son.

References

Living people
1990s births
Politicians from Nashua, New Hampshire
Women state legislators in New Hampshire
Democratic Party members of the New Hampshire House of Representatives
21st-century American politicians
21st-century American women politicians